Morotherie is a cadastral parish of Ularara County New South Wales.

References

Parishes of Ularara County
Far West (New South Wales)